Aeon Motor (pinyin: Hóngjiā téng dònglì kējì) is an exporter and manufacturer of ATVs, scooters and mini-bikes in Taiwan and is based in Tainan City, Taiwan.

History 
Since 1970 AEON has manufactured plastic parts for motorcycles and scooters under the name of KUAN MEI PLASTIC CO., LTD. AEON MOTOR CO., LTD. was founded in 1998 and the product range was extended into scooters and motorcycles, engines, spare parts and accessories. AEON started supplying European markets. The ISO 9002 approval was received in 1999. In 1999 50cc-100cc ATVs were put into mass production. A 150cc ATV was offered in 2000 which featured a reverse gear 2001 saw a 180cc ATV 52 000 units were produced in 2000.

The factory was moved to Shan-Shang in August 2001, with a 33000 square meter area. New fabrication machinery was purchased and a modernized management system was introduced.

2007 - 2019 models 
AEON models for 2007 - 2019 included:

ATVs
 300 
 COBRA 220 
 OVERLAND125/180 
 SPORTY 125/180
 COBRA 50/100 
 REVO II 50/100 
 MINIKOLT 50

Scooters
 AERO 
 PULSAR 
 ECHO 
 ARGON 
 REGAL 
 NOX 
 ELITE 350i
 URBAN 350i
 CO-IN 125
 OZ 125/150
 OZS 150
 ES 150
 ESR 150

Mini-Bikes
 MINI-BIKE

See also
 List of companies of Taiwan
 List of Taiwanese automakers
 Automotive industry in Taiwan

References

External links
Official AEON Website

1998 establishments in Taiwan
Companies based in Tainan
Vehicle manufacturing companies established in 1998
Motorcycle manufacturers of Taiwan
Scooter manufacturers
Taiwanese brands